Edgar Kaiser may refer to:
 Edgar Kaiser Sr. (1908–1981), American industrialist, son of Henry J. Kaiser and father of Edgar Kaiser, Jr
 Edgar Kaiser Jr. (1942–2012), financier and owner of the Denver Broncos football team